Montego Bay Resort is a hotel and casino located in West Wendover, Nevada. In addition to the Wendover Nugget, it is located right on the border line between Nevada and Utah just south of Interstate 80. This casino as well as Rainbow and the Peppermill are owned and operated by Peppermill Casinos, Inc.

History
From 1948 to 2002, the building before becoming the Montego Bay was previously called the A-1 Club, the Jim's Casino and the Silver Smith Casino.

See also
Peppermill Casinos

References

Casino hotels
Casinos completed in 1984
Casinos in West Wendover, Nevada
Hotel buildings completed in 1984
Hotels in Nevada